Weightlifting was contested from 20 November to 29 November 1982 at the 1982 Asian Games in New Delhi, India. The competition included only men's events for ten different weight categories.

Medalists

Medal table

References

External links
Asian Weightlifting Confederation

 
1982 Asian Games events
1982
Asian Games
1982
International weightlifting competitions hosted by India